The 1956 Quebec general election was held on June 20, 1956, to elect members of the Legislative Assembly of Quebec, Canada.  The incumbent Union Nationale,  led by Maurice Duplessis, won re-election, defeating the Quebec Liberal Party, led by Georges-Émile Lapalme.

This was the fifth and final time (and the fourth in a row) that Duplessis led his party to a general election victory. No party has since been able to win more than three elections in a row.  Duplessis died in office in 1959.

It was Lapalme's second (and final) loss in a row as Liberal leader.  The Liberals did not manage to improve on their performance in the previous 1952 election.

Results

See also
 List of Quebec premiers
 Politics of Quebec
 Timeline of Quebec history
 List of Quebec political parties
 25th Legislative Assembly of Quebec

References

Quebec general election
Elections in Quebec
General election
Quebec general election